Esin Varan is an American actress and writer who has worked in film and television and on the stage. She has Turkish ancestry.

Acting career
Varan started acting at a very early age. She pursued her acting career while studying International Relations and Political Science at Marmara University, where she took a bachelor's degree. After establishing her acting career in Europe, she moved to New York City to study acting. She graduated from American Academy of Dramatic Arts and completed an exclusive year of advanced acting in the Academy Company. She acted in many films, TV Shows and Commercials.

Filmography

References

External links 
 
 
 sinematurk.info
 diziler.com
 backstage.com
 aksam.com
 hurriyet.com
 hurriyetdailynews.com

Turkish television actresses
Marmara University alumni
Actresses from Istanbul
Living people
Year of birth missing (living people)
21st-century American actresses